This is a survey of the postage stamps and postal history of Tunisia.

Tunisia is the northernmost country in Africa. It is bordered by Algeria to the west, Libya to the southeast, and the Mediterranean Sea to the north and east. Its area is almost 165,000 km², with an estimated population of just over 10.3 million. Its name is derived from the capital Tunis located in the north-east.

First stamps

The first stamps were issued for the French protectorate of Tunisia on 1 July 1888, marked "Régence de Tunis" (Regency of Tunis).

Independence
Tunisia achieved independence from France on March 20, 1956 as the Kingdom of Tunisia. A year later, Tunisia was declared a republic.

References

External links

Tunisia stamps
Stamps of Tunisia pictorial series, 1931-41

Communications in Tunisia
Tunisia